McDuffie or MacDuffie is a surname of Scottish and Irish origin. McDuffie/MacDuffie is an Anglicization of the Gaelic Mac Duibhshíthe ("son of Duibhshíth"). The Gaelic name is composed of two elements; dubh ("black") + síth ("peace"). The name is sometimes shortened to McPhee or McFee. Notable people with the surname include:

Arthur McDuffie (1946–1979), American citizen
Chris McDuffie, American musician
Duncan McDuffie (1877–1951), American architect
Dwayne McDuffie (1962–2011), American animator
George McDuffie (1790–1851), American politician
Glenn McDuffie (1927–2014), American sailor
Isaiah McDuffie (born 1999), American football player
J. D. McDuffie (1938–1991), American racing driver
James McDuffie (1929–2015), American politician
John McDuffie (1883–1950), American politician
John Van McDuffie (1841–1896), American politician
Kenyan McDuffie, American politician
O. J. McDuffie (born 1969), American football player
Robert McDuffie, American violinist
Trent McDuffie, American football player

See also
McDuffie County, Georgia – A county located in the U.S. state of Georgia
Tydings–McDuffie Act – Officially the Philippine Independence Act; Public Law 73-127
MacDuffie School – A private school for grades 6-12 located in Granby, Massachusetts, United States
Clan Macfie – A Scottish clan, whose ancestral lands were on the island of Colonsay, Inner Hebrides, Scotland
Mount McDuffie – A mountain in the Sierra Nevada, California

Notes

External links
McDuffie Y chromosome DNA project

Scottish surnames
Surnames of Irish origin
Anglicised Irish-language surnames